Madhuban is a village in the Pirtand CD block in the Dumri subdivision of the Giridih district in the Indian state of Jharkhand.

Geography

Location

Area overview
Giridih district is a part of the Chota Nagpur plateau, with rocky soil and extensive forests. Most of the rivers in the district flow from the west to east, except in the northern portion where the rivers flow north and north west. The district has coal and mica mines. It is an overwhelmingly rural district with small pockets of urbanisation. 

Note: The map alongside presents some of the notable locations in the district. All places marked in the map are linked in the larger full screen map.

Demographics
According to the 2011 Census of India, Madhuban had a total population of 3,059, of which 1,646 (54%) were males and 1,413 (46%) were females. Population in the age range 0-6 years was 488. The total number of literate persons in Madhuban was 1,768 (68.77% of the population over 6 years).

Transport
National Highway 14A, locally popular as Isri-Giridih Road, passes near Madhuban.

Indian Railways have signed a joint venture agreement, in January 2017, with Jharkhand for railway development in the state. This agreement includes the Giridih-Parashnath-Madhuban line.

Culture
The Shamosharan Temple and Bhomiyajee Asthan are well known. The Daharam Mangal Vidapith temple is more recently constructed.

References

External links

Villages in Giridih district